The Security Council of the Union of Soviet Socialist Republics (USSR) was formed on March 15, 1990. The head of this organ was the President of the Soviet Union; he had the power to appoint and dismiss all members of the council. Article 127.3 of the USSR Constitution stipulated that the president of the USSR led the Security Council, which would develop recommendations to implement the all-union policy on national defense, nationality issues, state security, the pace and scope of economic reforms, economic and environmental security and hazards, coping with natural disasters and other emergencies, to ensure stability and legal order in Soviet society. Its members were confirmed by the Supreme Soviet of the Soviet Union.

Its first members included Prime Minister Valentin Pavlov, Vice President Gennady Yanayev, Foreign Minister Alexander Bessmertnykh (politician), Defence Minister and Marshall of the Soviet Union Dmitry Yazov, KGB Chairman Vladimir Kryuchkov, Interior Minister Boris Pugo, along with two "special" members with full time council responsibilities: Vadim Bakatin (who focused on political affairs), and Yevgeny Primakov (who had responsibility for economic affairs).

References

Security Council
1991 disestablishments in the Soviet Union
1990 establishments in the Soviet Union
Perestroika
Soviet Union